Trevor John Frischmon (born August 5, 1981) is an American professional ice hockey center who is currently an unrestricted free agent  who spent a short period of time playing in the National Hockey League (NHL) with the Columbus Blue Jackets.

Undrafted, Frischmon played within the Blue Jackets organization for 5 seasons. He featured in 3 NHL games with the Blue Jackets during the 2009–10 season. After his fifth season with the Blue Jackets American Hockey League affiliates, Frischmon left as a free agent to sign a one-year, two way contract with the New York Islanders on July 5, 2011. Frischmon never played with the Islanders, having been assigned to their AHL affiliate, the Bridgeport Sound Tigers for the duration of the 2011–12 season.

He later embarked on a European career, with the Graz 99ers, Mora IK and most recently played with the Coventry Blaze in the Elite Ice Hockey League.

Career statistics

References

External links

1981 births
Living people
American men's ice hockey centers
Bridgeport Sound Tigers players
Charlotte Checkers (1993–2010) players
Colorado College Tigers men's ice hockey players
Columbus Blue Jackets players
Coventry Blaze players
Dayton Bombers players
Graz 99ers players
Ice hockey players from Minnesota
Lincoln Stars players
Mora IK players
People from Ham Lake, Minnesota
Springfield Falcons players
Syracuse Crunch players
Undrafted National Hockey League players